Vanessa Rivas (born 25 July 1996) is a Dominican Republic swimmer. She competed in the women's 100 metre breaststroke event at the 2017 World Aquatics Championships.

References

1996 births
Living people
Dominican Republic female swimmers
Place of birth missing (living people)
Female breaststroke swimmers